Ayer Tawar (Chinese: 爱大华; Pinyin: Ài Dàhuá) is a small town of 30,000 people in Manjung District, Perak, Malaysia. Air Tawar literally means "fresh water" in the Malay language. The town is less well-known than its immediate and larger neighbour Sitiawan, which is 12 kilometres away.

Geography and layout
Ayer Tawar is about 60 km west of the state capital, Ipoh, and about 22 km from Lumut, where the largest Malaysian naval base is situated. You can reach the town from the North South Highway via Penang to Taiping to Pantai Remis, via Ipoh or the coastal road from Telok Intan to Sitiawan.

Ayer Tawar includes a number of new villages e.g. Kampong Raja Hitam, Kampong Merbau, Kampong Jering, and the largest of all, Ayer Tawar New Village.

The town is divided into two sections known as Old Town and New Town by the Ayer Tawar River. Ironically, certain buildings in the Old Town are even newer than those in the New Town due to redevelopment, from repeated fires which gutted the original thatched wooden shophouses. Today, development is going on in the New Town along the row of shophouses next to Jalan Sekolah, the road leading to the Min Te Chinese Primary School, which is the oldest school of the town.

Besides that, there are a few other primary schools within the township. For example, Ayer Tawar Tamil Primary School, Pei Min Primary School in Kampong Raja Hitam, Merbau Primary School in Kampong Merbau and Ayer Tawar Primary (C)school.

Notable landmarks in Ayer Tawar include: the Chinese Methodist Church, Taoist Nine Emperor Gods Temple, a Hindu Krishna Temple, 2 Buddhist monasteries Guang Ji Gong and Nan Hai Guangying, and the Kutien Association Building.

Economy
Like many other rural townships, Ayer Tawar is economically dependent on its agro-based industries. The town is surrounded by plantations and small holdings of commercial crops, such as oil palms, rubber trees, cocoa, coconut trees and, recently, fruit plants such as durian and mango.

From 1910 to 1970, rubber was the sole commercial crop cultivated by the farmers and the British plantation owners. The economic well-being of the population invariably fluctuated in tandem with the price of rubber. In the early 1970s, the town suffered a devastating economic slump due to prolonged low rubber prices. This led to 3 significant developments: the emigration of the younger populace to major cities such as Singapore, Kuala Lumpur, Penang and even the United Kingdom, to seek a better living; the migration of many farming families to new settlements such as Sri Jaya in Pahang and southern part of Thailand where the Gutian dialect is still spoken; and lastly the diversification of cultivation to include other commercial crops, the most important of which is the planting of oil palms. The latter now dominates land use in the vicinity.

Demographics
Ethnic Chinese, mostly from the Gutian County of Fujian, comprise the majority of Ayer Tawar's population. Most of them work in rubber estates and oil palm plantations, or participate in the retail industry. Outlying villages are populated by Malay people, mainly paddy and fruit farmers. Ayer Tawar currently faces a problem of emigration of its younger residents to other bigger towns and cities.

Schools
There are 3 secondary schools (SMK Ambrose, SMK Methodist, SMJK Ayer Tawar) and a dozen primary schools consisting of 3 Tamil primary school, 2 National (Malay) and 7 Chinese. The secondary schools are non-communal. However, Chinese students are the majority in two of the three secondary schools, due to the demography of the town. About 6 kilometers away, there is the Nan Hua Chinese Independent Secondary School.

Cuisine
Ayer Tawar is noted for its Chinese Fuzhou cuisine and especially its oven baked rounded onion/lard biscuit called kong pian.

External links
 Manjung Community eSpace 
 Ayer Tawar at VirtualTourist.com 

Manjung District
Towns in Perak